General efferent fibers may refer to:

 General somatic efferent fibers
 General visceral efferent fibers